The New Caledonia women's national basketball team is the women's national basketball team of New Caledonia. It is managed by the Région Fédérale de Nouvelle Calédonie de Basketball.

The team has won several medals at the Pacific Games.

See also 
 New Caledonia women's national under-19 basketball team
 New Caledonia women's national under-17 basketball team
 New Caledonia women's national 3x3 team

References

External links
New Caledonia Basketball Records at FIBA Archive
New Caledonia National Team at australiabasket.com

Women's national basketball teams
Basketball teams in New Caledonia
B